The Rector Commercial Historic District encompasses the original 1882 central business district of Rector, Arkansas.  It includes a roughly triangular area of the city, bounded on the west by Main Street, the north by 3rd Street, and the southeast by the railroad tracks.  Most of the district was developed before 1920, and includes a significant concentration of buildings with iron components in their storefronts provided by the noted St. Louis, Missouri firm, the Mesker Brothers, and other similar producers of such architectural elements.  The district's buildings are otherwise predominantly brick.

The district was listed on the National Register of Historic Places in 2009.

See also
National Register of Historic Places listings in Clay County, Arkansas

References

Historic districts on the National Register of Historic Places in Arkansas
Neoclassical architecture in Arkansas
Buildings designated early commercial in the National Register of Historic Places in Arkansas
Buildings and structures completed in 1915
Buildings and structures in Clay County, Arkansas
National Register of Historic Places in Clay County, Arkansas